SCTV01C is a COVID-19 vaccine candidate developed by Sinocelltech.

References 

Clinical trials
Chinese COVID-19 vaccines
Protein subunit vaccines